An So-hyun (born December 28, 2001) is a South Korean figure skater. She is the 2017 CS Minsk-Arena Ice Star bronze medalist and 2015 South Korean national bronze medalist. She competed in the final segment at the 2017 World Junior Championships.

Career
Competing on the senior level, An won the bronze medal at the 2015 South Korean Championships. She became age-eligible for junior international events in the 2015–2016 season. By placing third at a South Korean qualification competition, she earned two 2015–16 ISU Junior Grand Prix (JGP) assignments. Competing in the JGP series, she placed 8th in Bratislava, Slovakia and 5th in Logrono, Spain.

In the 2016–2017 season, An received no JGP assignments but was sent to the 2016 Autumn Classic International, where she won the junior bronze medal. She finished 7th at the 2017 South Korean Championships and was assigned to the 2017 World Junior Championships in Taipei after another skater withdrew. She qualified to the free skate in Taiwan.

Programs

Competitive highlights

Detailed results

Senior

Junior level 

 Personal bests highlighted in bold.

References

Skate Canada Autumn Classic International Results, 2 November 2018.
TRIGLAV TROPHY 2014, 2 November 2018.
ASIAN OPEN FIGURE SKATING TROPHY 2014, 2 November 2018.
TRIGLAV TROPHY 2015, 2 November 2018.

External links
 
 2014 Triglav Trophy results
 Asian Open Figure Skating Trophy 2014 results
 

2001 births
Living people
South Korean female single skaters
Figure skaters from Seoul